Procambarus morrisi, the Putnam County cave crayfish, is a species of crayfish in the family Cambaridae. It is only known from the type locality, at the Devil's Sink, west of Interlachen, Putnam County, Florida, and is listed as critically endangered on the IUCN Red List.

References

Cambaridae
Endemic fauna of Florida
Freshwater crustaceans of North America
Cave crayfish
Taxonomy articles created by Polbot
Crustaceans described in 1991